S. P. Mylvaganam was a Sri Lankan radio broadcaster. He was the first Tamil language announcer for the Commercial Service of Radio Ceylon. He had fans across Sri Lanka and India.

Vannakam
Listeners liked his relaxed style and they recognised his voice instantly when he uttered one word ' Vannakam ' - in Tamil, it means ' Welcome.' His wife, Chenthimani Mylvaganam, was the first lady news reader at Radio Ceylon. It was through his wife that Mr Mylvaganam was introduced to announcing. He  presented a range of Tamil programmes on the Commercial Service. He was trained by the Australian administrator Clifford Dodd  who came to work for Radio Ceylon under the Colombo Plan  and by Livy Wijemanne.

Iconic status
Mylvaganam belonged to that select band of announcers of Radio Ceylon who enjoyed iconic status in South Asia. Radio Ceylon, now the Sri Lanka Broadcasting Corporation, is the oldest radio station in the region. 
 
He helped popularise Radio Ceylon in India - millions tuned into the station. In a time where announcers arose above narrow racial barriers, Mylvaganam had close friendships with Sinhala announcers who worked on the English and Sinhala services. He worked very closely with Vernon Corea on radio programmes and they shared ideas together. Mylvaganam was popular right across South Asia.

Involvement with Tamil Stars from India
Mylvaganam was very involved with Tamil stars of the time such as Shivaji Ganeshan, MGR and other popular stars, such was his pulling power on the Indian sub-continent. He and his wife were the catalysts who brought MGR and Saroja Devi to Sri Lanka on his first visit in October 1965, to judge a beauty pageant in Kandy, sponsored by the Independent Newspapers Ltd. It still remains very vividly in many peoples memory the day MGR and Saroja Devi visited Mylvaganan's residence in Colombo. The railway tracks, the streets and the beach were spilling with crowds shouting and screaming to see MGR and Saroja Devi.

Naan Kanda Sorgam (நான் கண்ட சொர்க்கம்) 
In an Indian film titled Naan Kanda Sorgam (நான் கண்ட சொர்க்கம்), the comedian Thangavelu goes to heaven and when he meets God Indira he tries to show him the western song and he tunes the Radio the first thing he hears is the voice of Mylvaganam and says "Oh! He has come here too". This shows how much pride he has achieved during that time. He was the first Tamil Disc Jockey in the sense of western radio.

See also
Vernon Corea
Radio Ceylon
Sri Lanka Broadcasting Corporation
List of Sri Lankan broadcasters

References

Bibliography 
 Wavell, Stuart. - The Art of Radio - Training Manual written by the Director Training of the CBC. - Ceylon Broadcasting Corporation, 1969.

External links 
 Sri Lanka Broadcasting Corporation
 To listen S.P.Mylvaganan's voice எஸ்.பி.மயில்வாகனனின் குரலைக் கேட்க...
 Reflections from one of S. P. Mylvaganam's contemporaries
 SLBC-creating new waves of history
Eighty Years of Broadcasting in Sri Lanka

Sri Lankan radio personalities
Sri Lankan Tamil journalists
Year of birth missing
Year of death missing
Sri Lankan Hindus